Castelo Futebol Clube, commonly known as Castelo, is a Brazilian football club based in Castelo, Espírito Santo state.

History
The club was founded on January 1, 1939. Castelo won the Campeonato Capixaba Second Level in 1988. They competed in the Campeonato Capixaba First Level for the last time in 1995. The club closed its football department in 2002, reopening it in 2010, to compete in the 2011 Campeonato Capixaba Second Level again.

Achievements
 Campeonato Capixaba Second Level:
 Winners (1): 1988

Stadium
Castelo Futebol Clube play their home games at Estádio Emílio Nemer. The stadium has a maximum capacity of 3,000 people.

References

Association football clubs established in 1939
Football clubs in Espírito Santo
1939 establishments in Brazil